Bobby Johns (born May 17, 1946) is a former football coach. He served as an assistant coach in the college ranks for many years as well as head coach for a pair of high schools and at the University of West Alabama from 1997 through 2000. He is also a former college football All-American defensive back who played for coach Bear Bryant at the University of Alabama.

Early years
After graduating from Banks High School in Birmingham, Alabama, Johns enrolled at the University of Alabama. Playing quarterback in high school, during his freshman year he moved to defensive back. For the Crimson Tide, Johns was a member of the 1965 national championship team, was selected All-SEC three times (1965–1967) and All-America twice (1966–1967). He was selected in the 12th Round of the 1968 NFL Draft by the Kansas City Chiefs, but elected to pursue a coaching career instead. As recognition for his career at Alabama, Johns was elected to the Alabama Sports Hall of Fame in 2010.

Coaching career
Early in his career, Johns coach at both McAdory and E.B. Erwin High School where he compiled an overall record of 52 wins and 30 losses (52–30) during his eight-year tenure as a high school head coach. From Erwin, Johns entered the college coaching ranks in 1972 where he coached defensive backs at Florence State University now UNA. Between 1984 and 1996 he coached at Valdosta State, Florida State, Chattanooga, Eastern Kentucky, South Carolina and West Alabama. After serving one season as defensive coordinator at West Alabama, in December 1996 he was promoted to the head coach position after the resignation of Todd Stroud. Prior to entering the 2000 season with the Tigers, Johns announced he would resign from his position effective at the end of the season. For his career at West Alabama, Johns compiled a record of 11 wins and 31 losses (11–31).

Head coaching record

College

References

1946 births
Living people
Alabama Crimson Tide football players
All-American college football players
Chattanooga Mocs football coaches
Eastern Kentucky Colonels football coaches
Florida State Seminoles football coaches
High school football coaches in Alabama
North Alabama Lions football coaches
Sportspeople from Birmingham, Alabama
Players of American football from Birmingham, Alabama
South Carolina Gamecocks football coaches
University of Alabama alumni
Valdosta State Blazers football coaches
West Alabama Tigers football coaches